The Scots song "Ae fond kiss and then we sever" by the Scottish poet Robert Burns is more commonly known as "Ae fond kiss". It is Burns' most recorded love song.

History

After the publication of his collected poems, the Kilmarnock volume, Burns regularly travelled and stayed at Edinburgh. While there he established a platonic relationship with Mrs Agnes Maclehose and they began a regular correspondence using the pseudonyms 'Clarinda' and 'Sylvander'. Burns wrote 'Ae fond kiss' after their final meeting and sent it to Maclehose on 27 December 1791 before she departed Edinburgh for Jamaica to be with her estranged husband.

The letter is held by National Library of Scotland as part of the Watson Autograph collection of manuscripts.

Burns' original setting of three verses in eight lines was set to the tune of Rory Dalls' Port. The musical score  was published in the collection of Scottish folks songs known as the Scots Musical Museum. The melody playable on the link here is not Rory Dalls Port, but perhaps is now more associated with the words than the original.

Lyrics 

The Ae is pronounced to rhyme with "hay".

Glossary
 = adj only; sole. art a.
 = adj every 
 = adv|conj so

Recordings 
Aneka (Mary Sandeman) – B-side to "Japanese Boy" (1981)
 Karan Casey – Ships in the Forest
 Celtic Woman - Ancient Land
 Steve Harley - Uncovered (2020)

References 

Poetry by Robert Burns
1790s songs
1791 in Scotland
1791 poems
Songs with lyrics by Robert Burns
Scots-language works